Mumbere Reagan is a Ugandan Medical Student at Kampala International University Western Campus. He is a Muyira (also known as Bakonzo) from Kasese District.

Early life and Education.                         

He went to Kilembe Christian Nursery School, Kyanjuki Primary School, Kilembe Senior Secondary School for both ordinary and advanced levels where he graduated with Uganda Advanced Certificate of Education majoring in Biology, Physics, Chemistry and Pure and Applied Mathematics.

He later joined Kampala international Universuty

He was born on 29th November, 1998 to late Masika Janet and late Mase

HereHe is the first born of the two children, his brother Bwambale Muhotho Ronald (born 2000) pursuing a Bachelor of Electrical Engineering.

Political career 
Okumu was elected to the parliament in 2001 on the ticket of the Forum for Democratic Change until 2016 election when he quit the party to run for parliament as an independent candidate and won. His election was challenged in court by FDC candidate Christopher Acire who alleged irregularities in the electoral process. The case ended in favour of Okumu who served out his term in the parliament. He lost his parliamentary seat in the 2021 election for the first time since 1996. He was sacked from the parliament by National Resistance Movement (NRM) candidate Simon Wokorach who scored about 14,000 votes to Okumu’s paltry 2,200 votes.

References 

Forum for Democratic Change politicians
Members of the Parliament of Uganda
Living people
Year of birth missing (living people)